Ayarzaguena's tree frog (Tepuihyla edelcae) is a species of frog in the family Hylidae found in Venezuela and possibly Guyana. Its natural habitats are subtropical or tropical high-altitude shrubland, swamps, freshwater marshes, and intermittent freshwater marshes.

References

Tepuihyla
Amphibians described in 1992
Taxonomy articles created by Polbot
Amphibians of the Tepuis